Gregoia is a genus of small sea snails, marine gastropod mollusks in the family Triviidae, the false cowries or trivias.

Species
Species within the genus Gregoia include:
 Gregoia aemula Fehse, 2015
 [[Gregoia albamargarita]] Fehse, 2015
 Gregoia albengai Fehse, 2015
 Gregoia alta Fehse, 2017
 Gregoia ariejansseni Fehse, 2017
 Gregoia barbarabugeae Fehse, 2017
 Gregoia boucheti Fehse, 2015
 Gregoia brami Fehse, 2017
 Gregoia crassilabra Fehse, 2017
 Gregoia danielleae Fehse, 2015
 Gregoia densedentata Fehse, 2015
 Gregoia distantia Fehse, 2015
 Gregoia dorsorotunda Fehse, 2017
 Gregoia eua Fehse, 2017
 Gregoia formosa Fehse, 2015
 Gregoia hypsocollis Fehse, 2017
 Gregoia josephica Fehse, 2017
 Gregoia latilabra Fehse, 2017
 Gregoia mariecatherinae Fehse, 2015
 Gregoia mauricetteae Fehse, 2015
 Gregoia multidentata Fehse, 2017
 Gregoia nuda Fehse, 2017
 Gregoia oscilla Fehse, 2017
 Gregoia paenegloba Fehse, 2015
 Gregoia peregrina Fehse, 2017
 Gregoia petitdevoizei Fehse, 2015
 Gregoia prunum Fehse, 2017
 Gregoia ramosa Fehse, 2017
 Gregoia rimatara Fehse, 2015
 Gregoia salebrosa Fehse, 2017
 Gregoia tenera Fehse, 2015
 Gregoia tonga Fehse, 2017
 Gregoia umera Fehse, 2017
 Gregoia vitrosphaera (Dolin, 2001)
 Gregoia vorago Fehse, 2015
 Gregoia yurikantori Fehse, 2015

References

 Fehse D. (2015). Contributions to the knowledge of Triviidae, XXIX-B. New Triviidae from the Philippines. Visaya. supplement 5: 17-47

External links

Triviidae